Dorothy, a publishing project is a St. Louis-based small press publishing house founded by Danielle Dutton and Martin Riker in 2009. Dorothy specializes in publishing short works of literary fiction written by women. The press releases two books each year, with the titles being a mix of new works and reprints. Some are written in English and others are translated from foreign languages. Dorothy has been lauded for its promotion of experimental literature that blends together different forms and styles, often crossing over between prose and poetry, as well as for its design aesthetic and the tactile appeal of its books as physical objects.

Dorothy is largely operated by its founders. The press derives its name from Dutton's great-aunt, Dorothy Traver. Traver worked as a librarian in San Bernardino County in the 1950s and 60s. She travelled around in her station wagon into delivering books to distant towns that were lacking in libraries and well stocked book shops. Renee Gladman, the first author published by Dorothy, also helped in choosing the press's name.

A writer for The Atlantic said, "Dorothy books emerge each October like ringing endorsements of writers you’ve never heard of by a friend whose taste you can absolutely trust."

Notable authors 
 Nell Zink
 Joanna Ruocco
 Nathalie Léger 
 Barbara Comyns
 Leonora Carrington
 Marianne Fritz
 Renee Gladman
 Manuela Draeger
 Amina Cain
 Suzanne Scanlon
 Azareen Van Der Vliet Oloomi
 Joanna Walsh
 Jen George
 Cristina Rivera Garza
 Sabrina Orah Mark
 Rosmarie Waldrop
 Marguerite Duras

Books 

 Me & Other Writing by Marguerite Duras (translated by Olivia Baes & Emma Ramadan) 
 The Hanky of Pippin's Daughter by Rosmarie Waldrop
 Wild Milk by Sabrina Orah Mark
 The Taiga Syndrome by Cristina Rivera Garza (translated by Suzanne Jill Levine & Aviva Kana)
 Houses of Ravicka by Renee Gladman
 The Complete Stories by Leonora Carrington
 The Babysitter at Rest by Jen George
 Suite for Barbara Loden by Nathalie Léger (translated by Natasha Lehrer & Cécile Menon)
 Vertigo by Joanna Walsh
 The Weight of Things by Marianne Fritz (translated by Adrian Nathan West)
 The Wallcreeper by Nell Zink
 Dan by Joanna Ruocco
 Creature by Amina Cain
 Ana Patova Crosses a Bridge by Renee Gladman
 Promising Young Women by Suzanne Scanlon
 Fra Keeler by Azareen Van der Vliet Oloomi
 In the Time of the Blue Ball by Manuela Draeger (translated by Brian Evenson & Valerie Evenson)
 The Ravickians by Renee Gladman
 Who Was Changed and Who Was Dead by Barbara Comyns
 Event Factory by Renee Gladman

References

External links 

 Wild Milk in The Paris Review Staff's Favorite Books of 2018

Book publishing companies based in Missouri
Publishing companies established in 2009